The M18 Road is a road in Zambia that connects Kitwe in the Copperbelt Province with Kasempa in the North-Western Province via Kalulushi and Lufwanyama. It is the only other road after the T5 Road that connects the towns of the North-Western and Copperbelt provinces. The section from Kitwe to Kalulushi is designated as the M7 Road while the remainder of the route from Kalulushi westwards is designated as the M18 Road on Zambia's road network.

M7 road

The M7 begins in the commercial city centre of Kitwe, at a junction with the T3 Road from Chingola in the north-west and Ndola in the south-east. It begins by going westwards as Kanyanta Road up to the Mindolo Road junction, where it becomes Mindolo Road towards the north-west. At the second left turn, the M7 turns westwards and goes for 6 kilometres to reach a junction with the M18 Road east of Kalulushi. From the M18 junction, the M7 goes westwards for another 6 kilometres, meeting the southern terminus of the M16 Road  (which connects to Chambishi), to end in Kalulushi Central.

M18 road 
From the M7 junction east of Kalulushi, the M18 starts by going southwards for a few metres before turning westwards to separate Kalulushi Central from the southern part of the town, where it meets a road to Southdowns Airport. From Kalulushi, the M18 goes westwards for 245 kilometres, through the rural town of Lufwanyama, crossing into the North-Western Province, to reach its western terminus at a junction with the M8 Road in the settlement named Kawana in Kasempa District (60 kilometres north of Kasempa), with the M8 providing access to the town of Kasempa in the south (& Solwezi in the north).

Route for trucks 
In order for heavy vehicles coming from Ndola and Lusaka (using the T3 Road) to avoid the Kitwe City Centre and Kitwe's northern suburbs (which are busy commercial areas) on the way to DR Congo via Chingola, trucks are advised to use the M7 Road from Kitwe to Kalulushi, then the M16 Road from Kalulushi to Chambishi, as an alternative route. Just before Chambishi, heavy vehicles rejoin the main road and proceed through Chingola to the DR Congo Border (Kasumbalesa).

See also 
Roads in Zambia

References

Roads in Zambia
Copperbelt Province